Bishunpur Vishram is a village in Pachperwa block, Balrampur district, Uttar Pradesh, India.

Demographics
As of 2011 Indian Census, Bishunpur Vishram had a total population of 2,405, of which 1,196 were males and 1,209 were females.

References

Villages in Balrampur district, Uttar Pradesh